Jack Stovall (born ) is a former American football coach.  He was the fifth head football coach at the Central Connecticut State University in New Britain, Connecticut, serving for two seasons, from 1962 to 1963, and compiling a record of 3–15.

Head coaching record

College

References

Year of birth missing (living people)
1930s births
Living people
American football halfbacks
Central Connecticut Blue Devils football coaches
Delaware Fightin' Blue Hens football coaches
Michigan Wolverines football players
High school football coaches in Michigan
University of Delaware alumni
People from Howell, Michigan
Players of American football from Michigan
Sportspeople from Metro Detroit